The 1904 County Championship was the 15th officially organised running of the County Championship, and ran from 9 May to 5 September 1904. Lancashire won their second championship title, while six times champions Yorkshire finished in second place. The previous season's winners, Middlesex, finished in fourth place.

Table
 One point was awarded for a win, and one point was taken away for each loss. Final placings were decided by dividing the number of points earned by the number of completed matches (i.e. those that ended in a win or a loss), and multiplying by 100.

Records

Batting

References

1904 in English cricket
County Championship seasons
County